Cavillargues is a commune in the Gard department in southern France.

Geography

Climate

Cavillargues has a hot-summer Mediterranean climate (Köppen climate classification Csa).

Population

See also
Communes of the Gard department
 Cavillargues medallion

References

External links

 Webpage about Cavillargues

Communes of Gard